Qasemabad (also Romanized as Qāsemābād) is a village in Malekabad Rural District, in the Central District of Sirjan County, Kerman Province, Iran. At the 2006 census, its population was 426, in 99 families.

References 

Populated places in Sirjan County